Before the development of photographic copiers, a carbon copy was the under-copy of a typed or written document placed over carbon paper and the under-copy sheet itself (not to be confused with the carbon print family of photographic reproduction processes). When copies of business letters were so produced, it was customary to use the acronym "CC" or "cc" before a colon and below the writer's signature to inform the principal recipient that carbon copies had been made and distributed to the parties listed after the colon. With the advent of word processors and e-mail, "cc" is used as a merely formal indication of the distribution of letters to secondary recipients.

Process 
A sheet of carbon paper is placed between two or more sheets of paper. The pressure applied by the writing implement (pen, pencil, typewriter or impact printer) to the top sheet causes pigment from the carbon paper to reproduce the similar mark on the copy sheet(s). More than one copy can be made by stacking several sheets with carbon paper between each pair. Four or five copies is a practical limit. The top sheet is the original and each of the additional sheets is called a carbon copy.

History 

While carbon paper was invented by Pellegrino Turri in 1801, it was not widely used for copying until typewriters became common. Carbon copies were in wide use between the 1870s and 1980s, largely for administrative tasks.

Use 
The use of carbon copies declined with the advent of photocopying and electronic document creation and distribution (word processing). Carbon copies are still sometimes used in special applications: for example, in manual receipt books which have a multiple-use sheet of carbon paper supplied, so that the user can keep an exact copy of each receipt issued, although even here carbonless copy paper is often used to the same effect.

It is still common for a business letter to include, at the end, a list of names preceded by the abbreviation "CC", indicating that the named persons are to receive copies of the letter, even though carbon paper is no longer used to make the copies.

An alternative etymology is that "c:" was used for copy and "cc:" indicates the plural, just as "p." means page and "pp." means pages. This alternative etymology explains the frequent usage of "c:" when only one recipient is listed, while "cc:" is used for two or more recipients of the copies. This etymology can also explain why, even originally, "cc:" was used to list recipients who received typed copies and not necessarily carbon copies. Sometimes this "cc" is interpreted as "courtesy copy".

The term "carbon copy" can denote anything that is a near duplicate of an original ("...and you want to turn him into a carbon copy of every fourth-rate conformist in this frightened land!" Robert Heinlein, Stranger in a Strange Land).

Use as a verb
Carbon copy can be used as a transitive verb with the meaning described under e-mail below related to the CC field of an e-mail message. That is, to send the message to additional recipients beyond the primary recipient. It is common practice to abbreviate the verb form, and many forms are used, including cc and cc:. Past tense forms in use are CCed, cc'd, cc'ed, cc-ed and cc:'d. Present participle or imperfect forms in use include cc'ing. Merriam-Webster uses cc, cc'd and cc'ing, respectively.

Email

In common usage, an email message has three fields for addressees: the To field is for principal recipients of the message, the Cc field indicates secondary recipients whose names are visible to one another and to the principal, and the Bcc (blind carbon copy) field contains the names of tertiary recipients whose names are invisible to each other and to the primary and secondary recipients. It is considered good practice to indicate to the other recipients that a new participant has been added to the list of receivers (e.g. by writing "I sent a copy to John Doe" or "John Doe, who is reading in copy, [...]").

Printers
Dot matrix and daisy wheel impact printers are also able to use carbon paper to produce several copies of a document in one pass, and most models feature adjustable impact power and head spacing to accommodate up to three copies plus the original printout. Usually, this feature is used in conjunction with continuous, prearranged perforated paper and carbon supplies for use with a tractor feeder, rather than with single sheets of paper, for example, when printing out commercial invoices or receipts.

Examples

References

External links 
 

Email
Non-impact printing
Copying